Veil of Maya is an American metalcore band, formed in Chicago, Illinois, by members Marc Okubo and Sam Applebaum in 2004. They are currently signed to Sumerian Records and have released six studio albums. Their first four albums are considered to be deathcore, but their fifth album, Matriarch, is considered to be metalcore. They have also been associated with djent.

History

Formation and demo (2004–2006)
Veil of Maya formed in 2004 in Chicago, Illinois after melodic death metal band Insurrection broke up, which led members Marc (lead guitar), Sam (drums) and Kris (bassist) to start up the new project. Guitarist Timothy Marshall and vocalist Adam joined shortly thereafter.

After recording a  self-released demo in 2005, guitarist Scott Okarma briefly joined the group, participating in local shows and early touring. At this point, Veil of Maya were a six-piece band with three guitarists, but this only lasted for a few months before both Marshall and Okarma left the band. Bryan Ruppell replaced them both on rhythm guitar thus reverting their lineup back to five members.

All Things Set Aside and The Common Man's Collapse (2006–2009)
With this five member line-up, the band recorded, self-produced and released their debut full-length album All Things Set Aside through Corrosive Recordings in 2006. In early 2006 vocalist Clemans and guitarist Ruppell left the group leading Veil of Maya to enlist the help of then 20-year-old Brandon Butler, former vocalist of the Indiana metal band Iscariot. The band also decided not to search for a new rhythm guitarist, thus leaving Veil of Maya as a four-piece.

In January 2008, after heightened exposure from interviews and successful tours, Veil of Maya signed with Sumerian Records.  Sumerian manager Shawn Keith and founder Ash Avildsen were both reportedly very ecstatic about the partnership. Veil of Maya's second album, The Common Man's Collapse was recorded with Butler in 2008 and released the same year. Shortly after the album release, the band parted ways their original bassist Kristopher "Kris" Higler in 2009, and was replaced by Matthew Pantelis, formerly of Born of Osiris.

Id and Eclipse (2010–2012)
After their second album's release, the following several months held extensive touring before the writing and recording for the group's third full-length, Id began. Id was released on April 6, 2010, and reached number 107 on the Billboard 200. The band worked again with producer Michael Keene from The Faceless for this album, who previously produced The Common Man's Collapse. The album's name was derived from the main character of the PlayStation game Xenogears; the album itself also holds several concepts and references to other topics in popular culture, especially television shows.

After the release of Id, Pantelis as well left the band, which led to Danny Hauser replacing him in 2010; the band's current bassist. On January 13, 2012, Sumerian Records released a teaser for Veil of Maya's next album, Eclipse. On January 17, the single "Vicious Circles" was released onto the iTunes Store. Eclipse was then released on February 28, 2012 and was produced and co-written by Periphery guitarist Misha Mansoor.

On November 11, 2013 the band released a digital-only single, "Subject Zero", with a lyric video uploaded on YouTube two weeks earlier, on September 30, 2013.

Recording of new album and Butler's departure (2013–2014)
Veil of Maya announced in 2014 that they had finished writing the follow-up to Eclipse and were recording with Taylor Larson. However, progress was stopped as long-time vocalist Brandon Butler left the band, citing creative differences with his bandmates. Butler moved on to join a band named Lost Origins, which features former members of I Declare War.

Magyar's arrival and Matriarch (2014–2016)
At Knotfest 2014, Veil of Maya were seen performing with a new vocalist, who is well known in the local music scene of the state of Wisconsin, on January 1, 2015 it was announced that Arms of Empire vocalist Lukas Magyar joined the band replacing the departed Butler. At the same time, the band released a new single, "Phoenix".

Shortly after the announcement, the band headed out on the "Slow Your Troll and Know Your Role" tour with Upon a Burning Body, Volumes, Gideon and The Last Ten Seconds of Life. They also took part in the Ashes to Ashes European Tour with Chelsea Grin, Oceans Ate Alaska and Black Tongue (Black Tongue pulled out within the first few shows due to an injury sustained by frontman Alex Teyen).

On March 23, 2015, Veil of Maya officially announced the release of a new album, Matriarch, and released a new single, "Mikasa". The album was released on May 12, 2015 through Sumerian Records. It is the band's first release with Magyar, and represents somewhat of a departure from the style of the band's previous releases: it is less focused on technicality and is their first work to incorporate clean singing and replaces growling with hardcore-style screaming.

False Idol and Mother (2017–present)
On September 13, 2017, the band released a music video "Overthrow" on YouTube, and announced the album False Idol for October 20, 2017. The music video for the band's second single "Doublespeak" was added to YouTube on October 3, 2017. On September 12, 2019, they released the single "Members Only" off a future unknown album. On May 3, 2020, the band released a music video for the single "Outsider" and an animated music video for their single "Viscera" on February 27, 2021, from the presumed unannounced album. On October 6, 2021, their single "Outrun" was uploaded to YouTube as a music video.

On April 20, 2022, the band released the first single, "Synthwave Vegan". On February 8, 2023, the band unveiled the second single "Godhead" and its corresponding music video. On March 7, 2023, the band premiered the third single "Red Fur" with a music video. At the same time, they officially announced that their upcoming seventh studio album, Mother, is set for release on May 12, 2023 while also revealed the album cover and the track list.

Members

Current

 Marc Okubo – lead guitar (2004–present); rhythm guitar (2007–present); programming (2014–present)
 Sam Applebaum – drums (2004–present)
 Danny Hauser – bass (2010–present)
 Lukas Magyar – vocals (2014–present)

Former
 Scott Okarma – guitars (2006)
 Timothy Marshall – rhythm guitar (2004–2006)
 Adam Clemans – vocals (2004–2007)
 Bryan Ruppell – rhythm guitar (2006–2007)
 Kristopher Higler – bass (2004–2009)
 Matthew C. Pantelis – bass (2009–2010)
 Brandon Butler – vocals (2007–2014)

Timeline

Discography
Studio albums

Singles

Videography

References

External links

Djent
Musical groups established in 2004
Metalcore musical groups from Illinois
American deathcore musical groups
Technical death metal musical groups
Sumerian Records artists
Musical quartets
Musical groups from Chicago